The Panteion University of Social and Political Sciences, usually referred to simply as the Panteion University, is a university located in Athens, Greece. Founded in 1927, it is the oldest university of social and political sciences in Greece.

At Panteion University there is a student population of 19,000 students enrolled at graduate and postgraduate level and 360 teaching and administrative staff. The university also offers thirteen postgraduate courses and includes three research institutes, eighteen research centres and four laboratories.

History

The Panteion University has a long history of a creative development linked to the course of higher education and the development of social sciences in Greece.

It was founded in 1927 under the name School of Political Sciences, due to the envisagement of two persons who had studied at the Free School of Political Sciences in Paris (Sciences Po), Georgios Fragoudis and Alexandros Pantos. Pavlos Kountouriotis, the president of Greece at the time, inaugurated the central building of the university, which functioned for the first time on 18 November 1930, attended by 200 students. Alexandros Pantos bequeathed his fortune to the school, which was republished by the prime minister of Greece, Eleftherios Venizelos, making the institute stable in the academical scene of the country.

In 1931 the school was renamed to Panteios School of Political Sciences.

At the beginning, the contribution of the minister for national education, George Papandreou, was very important for the school, which consisted of two departments, the Political-Historical and the Social-Economical, while the studies were planned for six semesters. In 1936 the school was recognised as a "public utility of higher education" and in 1937 it was turned into a "legal person of public law". In 1951 the two departments were renamed to the Department of Political Science and Department of Public Administration, respectively, while the course of studies expanded to eight semesters in 1963.

After the reorganization of the Greek educational system in 1983, the Panteios School was divided into three departments: Political Science and International Studies, Public Administration, Sociology. In 1989 the School was renamed to its current name, Panteion University of Social and Political Sciences, and five new departments were created, these of: Communication and Mass Media, Psychology, Social Policy and Social Anthropology, Economic and Regional development, General Department of Law.

In the 1990s, two of the previous departments were split into two: Political Science and International Studies into: a) Political Science and History, b) International and European Studies, and Social Policy and Social Anthropology into: a) Social Policy, b) Social Anthropology. During the same period the campus expanded and improved.

Schools and academic departments
The university today consists of four schools and nine academic departments.

Research
Panteion University cooperates with many universities and institutes from 17 European countries, and offers a European MA Degree in Human Rights and Democratisation.

Academic Affiliations
The university participates in several European Union academic networks such as the Jean Monnet Programme, the Erasmus+ Programme, the EQUAL Community Initiative, Equapol, Tempus, Geopac.

Academic evaluation
In 2016 the external evaluation committee gave Panteion University a positive evaluation.

An external evaluation of all academic departments in Greek universities was conducted by the Hellenic Quality Assurance and Accreditation Agency (HQA).

University units and services

Library
The Panteion University Library is located at the central building of the university and it covers an area of 1,750 m2, divided into four floors. Its purpose is to provide the academic community with its variety of material. Provided that the university supports education and research, the Library offers automated services, printed and electronic collections, and online services as well.

The library has a reading room and it also operates as a lending library. Its collection covers the wide scientific area of social and political sciences with focus on sociology, history, law and political science, philosophy, psychology, economics, management, literature, information science, social anthropology, criminology, mathematics and accountancy. The collection consists of material written mainly in Greek and other languages such as English, French, German and Spanish.

The connection includes: 70,000 monographs, 547 active subscriptions in a total of 763 journals, more than 10,000 electronic journals, online databases, 15 bibliographic databases in CD-ROM which cover the period 1998–2002, 60 classical music CDs, 85 educational CD-ROMs, 20 maps, 500 VHS and DVDs of classical movies, and 308 slides from the National Gallery of London.

Gym 
Panteion University also has its own gym which is located in Neos Kosmos, near the metro station.

Notable people
Professors

Sakis Karagioras (1930–1985), Professor of Public Finance (1966), rector of the university (1981) 
Panagiotis Kanellopoulos (1902–1986), Professor of Law, philosopher, politician, prime minister of the Hellenic Republic (1945, 1967)
Andreas Loverdos (1956), Professor of Constitutional Law, politician, Minister for Health and Social Solidarity since 2009
Christos Rozakis (1941), Professor of International Law, currently the president of the Administrative Tribunal of the Council of Europe
Konstantinos Simitis (1936), Professor of Commercial Law, politician, prime minister of Greece (1996–2004)
Alexandros Svolos (1892–1956), Professor of Constitutional Law, member of Parliament
Michail Stasinopoulos (1903–2002), Professor of Administrative Law, rector of the university (1951–1958), politician, president of the Hellenic Republic (1974–1975)
Dimitris Tsatsos (1933–2010), Professor of Constitutional Law, member of the European Parliament (1999–2004)
Konstantinos Tsatsos (1899–1987), Professor of the Philosophy of Law, diplomat, president of the Hellenic Republic (1975–1980)
Ioannis Theodorakopoulos (1900–1981), Greek philosopher
Yannis Smaragdis (1946), film director, screenwriter
Christos Yannaras (1935), Professor of Philosophy, theologian
Yiorgos Veltsos (1944), Professor of Communication Theory and Sociology
Georgios Papachatzis (1905–1991), Professor of Administrative Law (1943–1967), rector of the university (1964–1965)

Notable alumni
Anna Diamantopoulou (1959), politician, former Minister of Education, former European Commissioner for Employment, Social Affairs and Equal Opportunities
Vangelis Meimarakis (1953), lawyer and politician, former Minister of National Defence, Speaker of the Hellenic Parliament
Stamatis Kraounakis (1955), music composer, music producer, lyricist, writer and director.
Giorgos Katsaros (1934), musician and songwriter
Yannis Stavrakakis (1970), political theorist
Sotiris Kovos, automobile designer

Alumni Association "Aristotle"
The Alumni Association "Aristotle" of the Panteion University is the oldest alumni association in Greece, founded in 1942 by a group of Panteion alumni, providing a wide variety of benefits to its members. Members' network strives to connect alumni to the university and to each other.

Eligible to register as members are all Panteion alumni, provided they have completed at Panteion University either their undergraduate or graduate studies, or both.

See also 
 List of universities in Greece
 List of research institutes in Greece
 Study in Greece – Official portal for studies in Greece 
 European Higher Education Area
 Hellenic Academic Libraries Link (HEAL-Link)) 
 Kallipos (e-books Greek academic publishing) 
 Greek Research and Technology Network (GRNET) 
 Education in Greece
 Open access in Greece

References

External links

 Panteion University – Official Website 
 Hellenic Quality Assurance and Accreditation Agency (HQA) 
 Panteion University DASTA Office (Career Office & Innovation Unit)   
 Panteion University Internal Quality Assurance Unit 

 
Universities in Greece
Education in Athens
Universities and colleges in Attica
Educational institutions established in 1927
1927 establishments in Greece
Kallithea